Schwarzenfeld is a municipality in the district of Schwandorf in Bavaria, Germany.

The melodic death metal band Deadlock is based in this municipality.

Climate

Notable buildings

References

Schwandorf (district)